Borgo Carige is a village in Tuscany, central Italy,  administratively a frazione of the comune of Capalbio, province of Grosseto. At the time of the 2001 census its population amounted to 229.

Borgo Carige is about 54 km from Grosseto and 5 km from Capalbio, and it is situated in the plain of southern Maremma between the hills of Capalbio and the Tyrrhenian Sea. It is located along the Via Aurelia highway which links Grosseto to Rome. The village is an important town born as a result of the Maremman Riforma agraria (land reform) in the 1950s.

Main sights 
 Church of Cuore Immacolato (20th century), main parish church of the village, it was built in 1958 and designed by Riccardo Medici in a Neo-Romanesque style.

References

Bibliography 
 Fabiola Favilli, Capalbio. Alla scoperta del borgo e del territorio, Arcidosso, C&P Adver Effigi, 2011.

See also 
 Capalbio Scalo
 Chiarone Scalo
 Giardino, Capalbio
 La Torba
 Pescia Fiorentina

Frazioni of Capalbio